Classified may refer to:

General
Classified information, material that a government body deems to be sensitive
Classified advertising or "classifieds"

Music
Classified (rapper) (born 1977), Canadian rapper
The Classified, a 1980s American rock band featuring Steve Vai
Classified Records, an American record label

Albums
Classified (Bond album), 2004
Classified (Classified album), 2013 
Classified (Sweetbox album), 2001
Classified, by James Booker, 1982

Songs
"Classified", by C. W. McCall from Wolf Creek Pass, 1975
"Classified", by the Orb from Metallic Spheres, 2010
"Classified", by Pete Townshend from the compilation Glastonbury Fayre, 1972
"Classifieds", by the Academy Is... from Almost Here, 2005

Other media
Classified (1925 film), an American silent film
Classified: The Edward Snowden Story, a 2014 Canadian film
Classified: The Sentinel Crisis, a 2005 video game for the Xbox

See also
Classification (disambiguation)
Classifier (disambiguation)